A powder keg is a barrel of gunpowder. The powder keg was the primary method for storing and transporting large quantities of black powder until the 1870s and the adoption of the modern cased cartridge. The barrels had to be handled with care, since a spark or other source of heat could cause the contents to deflagrate.

In practical use, powder kegs were small casks to limit damage from accidental explosions. Today they are valued as collectibles. Kegs for blasting powder used for mining or quarrying were often larger than kegs for shipping and storing powder for firearms.

Metaphor
A powder keg is also a metaphorical term for a region that political, socioeconomic, historical or other circumstances have made prone to outbursts. The analogy is drawn from a perception that certain territories may seem peaceful and dormant until another event triggers a large outburst of violence. The term is most often used to simplify and help the understanding of what is often a complex set of circumstances that lead to conflicts, such as the powder keg of Europe.

While the term can be used to designate the entire region of Europe, it is often used specifically to refer to the Balkan countries, due to their roles in the Balkan Wars and the First World War. The most cited event attributed to the use of the term was the assassination of Franz Ferdinand in Sarajevo, Bosnia and Herzegovina in 1914, the immediate trigger of World War I.

References 

Causes of war
Containers
English-language idioms
Gunpowder